Bashevo is a rural locality (a village) in Muromtsevskoye Rural Settlement, Sudogodsky District, Vladimir Oblast, Russia. The population was 20 as of 2010.

Geography 
Bashevo is located on the Sudogda River, 5 km south of Sudogda (the district's administrative centre) by road. Berezhki is the nearest rural locality.

References 

Rural localities in Sudogodsky District